Stuart McGregor is a Paralympian athlete from Canada competing mainly in category T13 400m to 1500m events.

McGregor has competed at three Paralympics, always in the 400 metres and one other event.  He has never won a medal in the 400m but has always medalled in the other event, firstly the T12 1500m in 1996 winning a silver, then in 2000 a bronze in the 800m a result that he repaested in 2004.

References

Athletes (track and field) at the 1996 Summer Paralympics
Athletes (track and field) at the 2000 Summer Paralympics
Athletes (track and field) at the 2004 Summer Paralympics
Living people
Paralympic track and field athletes of Canada
Paralympic bronze medalists for Canada
Paralympic silver medalists for Canada
Medalists at the 1996 Summer Paralympics
Medalists at the 2000 Summer Paralympics
Medalists at the 2004 Summer Paralympics
Year of birth missing (living people)
Paralympic medalists in athletics (track and field)
Canadian male middle-distance runners
Visually impaired middle-distance runners
Paralympic middle-distance runners